Renda is a village located in Renda Parish in the northeast section of Kuldīga Municipality in the Courland region of Latvia. It is famous for being the birthplace of the soldier Pēteris Dzelzītis. Located within the village is the Renda Church, established in 1786.

References

See also
 Heinrich Baron von Behr

Villages in Latvia
Kuldīga Municipality
Courland